István Priboj Slovak, Štefan Priboj, (2 May 1894 – 27 October 1957, in Žilina) was a former Hungarian and Slovak football player and coach. He played for Újpesti TE, 1. ČsŠK Bratislava and Dynamo Žilina, and he was the top scorer in the Hungarian championship in 1922–23. He played 6 matches for the Hungarian team, scoring 3 goals between 1919 and 1925. From 1940 to 1941, he coached the Slovak national team.

References

1894 births
1957 deaths
Hungarian footballers
Slovak footballers
Czechoslovak footballers
Slovak football managers
Czechoslovak football managers
Újpest FC players
ŠK Slovan Bratislava players
Association football forwards
Hungary international footballers